Elaboration (from Latin ex- "out" + laborare "to labor") is the act of adding more information to existing information to create a more complex, emergent whole. Elaboration is the variant of development implementation: creating new structure relations, putting together, drawing up. It can be defined as adding details or "expanding on" an idea. It involves developing an idea by incorporating details to amplify the original simple idea. Elaboration enhances ideas and objects by providing nuance and detail. Elaboration may involve planning or executing a task with painstaking attention to numerous parts or details.

Examples
In the law, a bill of particulars is an elaboration of allegations, theories of law, and facts contained in another pleading, such as a complaint, answer, or reply.

In mathematics, an iteration is the elaboration of a function.

See also

 Accuracy and precision
 Ambiguity
 Collaboration
 Metacognition
 Minimum viable product
 Network science
 Network theory
 Theory of mind
 Verbosity

References

Rhetorical techniques
Style (fiction)